"Sumahama" is a song by American rock band the Beach Boys from their 1979 album L.A. (Light Album). Written by Mike Love, it was lyrically inspired by his fiancé at the time, a woman named Sumako. The lyrics describe "a young girl who wants to go with her mother to a place called 'Sumahama' in search of her father." Although some of the lyrics are in Japanese, Sumako was of Korean descent.

Background
It was originally written by Mike Love for his unreleased solo album, First Love. When the release of that project fell through, the song was rerecorded by the Beach Boys.

The original United States LP release of the L.A. (Light Album) featured a version of "Sumahama" that faded out early during the final Japanese verse and did not feature the instrumental ending present on the later released 45 or the re-released CD version of the album. The original LP version of the song was approximately four minutes and seven seconds.

Single release
In the U.S., "Sumahama" was released as a B-side to the single "It's a Beautiful Day".

"Sumahama" was released as a single in the UK backed with "Angel Come Home", charting at number 45.

Personnel
Per Craig Slowinski.

The Beach Boys
Mike Love – lead vocals
Carl Wilson - backing vocals
Bruce Johnston - backing vocals

Additional musicians

Murray Adler - violin
Roberleigh Barnhart - cello
Myer Bello - viola
Alfred Breuning - violin
Isabelle Daskoff - violin
Earle Dumler - oboe
Jesse Ehrlich - cello
Bryan Garofalo - bass guitar
Igor Horoshevsky - cello
Bill House - guitar
Bernard Kundell - violin
William Kurasch - violin
Gayle Levant - harp
Joy Lyle - violin
Brian O’Connor - French horn
Earl Palmer - drums
Joel Peskin - flute
Jay Rosen - violin
Sid Sharp - violin
Barbara Thomason - cello
Tommy Vig - vibraphone
Jai Winding - Fender Rhodes
Herschel Wise - viola
Tibor Zelig - violin

References

1979 songs
The Beach Boys songs
Songs written by Mike Love
Song recordings produced by Bruce Johnston
Song recordings produced by James William Guercio